Angela de Jesus is a South African visual artist and curator living and working in Bloemfontein.

Background
de Jesus uses her Portuguese heritage and experience working in a takeaway shop to investigate intercultural exchange and visual perception. She uses hidden CCTV cameras as materials in her own video creations.

Career

Education
 MFA from the University of the Free State

Exhibitions
 Sasol New Signatures Competition at the Pretoria Art Museum
 Absa L’Atelier, ABSA Gallery, Johannesburg
 Bellville Gallery, Cape Town
 Oliewenhuis Art Museum
 Spier Contemporary 2010 - winner of Thamdigi Foundation Prize in Arnhem, Netherlands

Notable Works

Control Room

Video installation, size variable

References

1982 births
Living people
21st-century South African women artists
People from Bloemfontein
University of the Free State alumni
South African video artists
South African contemporary artists